Marcia Haufrecht  is an American actress, playwright and director, as well as a noted acting teacher and coach. A life member of The Actors Studio, and a longtime member of The Ensemble Studio Theatre, she is also the founder and artistic director of the Off-Off-Broadway company (and venue), The Common Basis Theatre (originally The Common Ground Theatre).

Early life
Haufrecht was the first of three children born to Herbert and Judith Haufreucht, the former a noted pianist, composer, folklorist and editor. A Manahattan native, born and bred, Haufrecht attended Performing Arts High School, graduating in 1954 as a dancer.

Career

Dance
Haufrecht said that Broadway was scarcely clamoring for "a barefoot, modern dancer", much less for one of Haufrecht's diminutive stature and limited experience. She made her Off-Broadway debut as an actress that September at the Cherry Lane Theatre, with a small part in the Studio 12  limited-run revival of Jean-Paul Sartre's The Flies. Her Broadway and her professional dancing debuts occurred two months later, when she was signed for the musical, Plain and Fancy. The show's choreographer, Helen Tamiris (a former colleague of Haufrecht's father) was instrumental in being included in the show. The show's producers changed Haufrecht's professional name to Howard, and so she remained for at least six years.

In the summer of 1955, Haufrecht toured nationally with Can-Can, a part that she attributed to fortuitous timing:
I think the only reason they hired me was because it was in the dead of summer, and the only people that showed up to the audition were strippers; they weren't really dancers. So they had to hire me; I was the only dancer that showed up.

Before she was 20, Haufrecht turned her attention to acting, as she told The Montreal Gazette in 1969, "because I hated being part of the background. I felt so superfluous. And I felt I had something to say... It was my ego." In 2012, Haufrecht said that her early career change, however rewarding in the long run, was born of necessity:
After I was done with Can-Can, I auditioned for a lot of shows, and I couldn't get anything... One day, I auditioned - I don't know if it was Damn Yankees - [but] it was a Bob Fosse show. And I'm down to the last fifteen and he needed twelve, or something like that. He pulls me aside and says, "I'd love to use you, Marcia. You're a wonderful dancer, you really are. But you're too short." I said to myself, "That's it; I'm outta here. I'm not dancing anymore."

Acting
Within a year or so, Haufrecht was working with Nola Chilton, a New York-based acting teacher and director. Haufrecht studied with Chilton for approximately four years, culminating in her participation in an Off-Broadway revival of Sidney Kingsley's Dead End, staged by Chilton.

Village Voice critic Michael Smith, praised both performance (including Haufrecht's "spectacularly destroyed whore") and production. However, she seriously contemplated giving up acting altogether because of dissatisfaction with her own contribution and with the quality of her work in general and her perceived lack of progress. Quickly dissuaded by her colleagues, Leibman in particular, Haufrecht followed the latter's advice and joined him at The Actors Studio to meet with studio director Lee Strasberg. Allowed to sit in on sessions on an interim basis, Haufrecht eventually earned her full membership via audition.

A member of the Studio since at least 1964, Haufrecht is a veteran of stage and screen, in roles ranging from White Cargo's exotic femme fatale, Tondeleyo  (her final appearance as Marcia Howard), to Richard III's eloquent nemesis, Queen Elizabeth, opposite Al Pacino (in the first of Pacino's three Richard's). She has performed at Lincoln Center, La MaMa, The Public Theater, with The Ensemble Studio Theatre, Center Stage in Baltimore, at the Adelphi Festival Theatre in Garden City, The Open Stage in Sarasota, in Montreal at Place des Arts, and in Berlin at the Friends of the Opera Theatre. Haufrecht's film appearances have, in recent years, included The Producers, The Night Listener, Anamorph, and Win Win; on TV, she has been seen in The Sopranos, as well as Law & Order, Law and Order: SVU, and Law and Order: Criminal Intent.

In April 2001, more than 20 years after its first production, Tennessee Williams' Will Mr. Merriweather Return from Memphis? premiered in New York at Haufrecht's Common Basis Theatre, with Haufrecht starring. Daily News critic Howard Kissel wrote, "The play's heady combination of black humor and poetry is best handled by Marcia Haufrecht, as the woman pining for her former boarder." Ken Jaworski of Off-Off-Broadway Review added:
As Louise McBride, Marcia Haufrecht was exquisite: a frail woman struggling to appear strong, an aging southern belle masking loneliness behind false laughter. "Even in a dream one can suffer," Louise claims. Haufrecht embodied the premise, projecting a drowsy, fatigued lonesomeness with each action and word.
The previous month, Haufrecht had garnered even stronger praise from Off-Off-Broadway Review's Doug DeVita as Common Basis staged another, less heralded premiere, Grace Cavalieri's Pinecrest Rest Haven:
A frail-looking woman, her white hair tied up in a simple purple ribbon, enters a peach-and-white nursing-home waiting room and plaintively asks if anyone has seen her husband. The question, asked with a heartbreaking, bewildered innocence by the haunting Marcia Haufrecht, is a startlingly lucid depiction of the loss of clarity that can come with advanced age... the one thing this production had going for it was the presence of Haufrecht, who effortlessly rose above the obvious material and gave a luminous, moving performance of concise truth... As the late, great Madeline Kahn once said about her own work: "I have appeared in crap, but I have never treated it as such. Never." Haufrecht obviously goes by that same standard, and her performance displayed a level of professionalism that most actors would do well to emulate.

Writing
From a playwright whose initial motivation had simply been to provide – at a director/colleague's request – an interesting acting vehicle for herself, Haufrecht's plays have been produced in New York City by Common Basis Theatre, The Ensemble Studio Theatre, and The Actors Studio, and, in upstate New York, by Performing Arts of Woodstock. Around the country, her work has been performed in Texas, Florida, in San Francisco, and, in Southern California, by Company of Angels and CSU Fullerton. Abroad, her plays have been staged in New Zealand, Australia at La Mama in Melbourne, and at the Kultur im Gugg in Austria.

Directing
As a director, Haufrecht has staged both original works and revivals at The Ensemble Studio Theatre, The Actors Studio, The Barrow Street Theatre, The Common Basis Theatre, and in Australia, Portugal, and Austria .

Teaching

A student of Lee Strasberg from the early 1960s until his death, Haufrecht taught at the Lee Strasberg Theatre Institute for five years; later, she worked for two years as an adjunct professor in Columbia University's graduate film program. Haufrecht has taught and coached privately for over thirty years; her students include Ellen Barkin, Alec Baldwin, Uma Thurman, Janine Turner, John Leguizamo, Debi Mazar, Loren Dean, David Duchovny, Ian Buchanan, and Harvey Keitel. She taught for several years in Australia, and in Austria; more recently, she has taught, and continues to teach, in Lisbon, Portugal, since the mid-1990s. In New York, Haufrecht was on the faculty of The Actors Studio MFA program at The New School for Social Research (where Haufrecht would remain when the MFA program departed for Pace University in 2006, staying there until her retirement in 2011).

Stage and screen credits

Theatre (partial listing)
These are acting credits except where otherwise indicated.

Television

Film

Notes

References

Further reading
Haufrecht, Marcia. Welfare: A Play in Two Acts. New York: Samuel French, 1980. Retrieved 2013-01-10.
Wrath, Andre J. "Review: The Common Basis Theatre presents 'Metamorphosis,' written by Marcia Haufrecht, directed by Marcia Haufrecht". The Off-Off-Broadway Review.  Volume 5, Number 11. May 1999. Retrieved 2013-01-02.
Wrath, Andre J. "Review: The Common Basis Theatre presents 'Dear Daughter,' directed by Marcia Haufrecht". The Off-Off-Broadway Review.  Volume 5, Number 12. June 17, 1999. Retrieved 2013-01-02.
Wrath, Andres J. "Nothing Common About This Theatre: An interview with Robert Haufrecht" The Off-Off-Broadway Review. Volume 6, Number 5. September 30, 1999. Retrieved 2013-01-02.
Mackler, David. "Review: Common Basis Theatre presents 'Ferris Wheel,' co-directed by Marcia Haufrecht.". The Off-Off-Broadway Review.  Volume 6, Number 28. March 23, 2000. Retrieved 2013-01-02.
DeVita, Doug. "Review: Common Basis Theatre presents 'Red Roses,' directed by Marcia Haufrecht". The Off-Off-Broadway Review.  Volume 6, Number 35. May 11, 2000. Retrieved 2013-01-02.
Lopata, James A. "Review: Common Basis Theatre presents 'Little Delusions, an Evening of One-Act Plays,' directed by Marcia Haufrecht". The Off-Off-Broadway Review.  Volume 6, Number 40. June 15, 2000. Retrieved 2013-01-02.
Wrath, Andre J. "Review: Common Basis Theatre presents 'Little Delusions, Two One-Acts,' directed by Marcia Haufrecht". The Off-Off-Broadway Review.  Volume 7, Number 5. August 10, 2000. Retrieved 2013-01-02.
Mart, Sheila. "Review: Common Basis Theatre presents 'Full Moon & High Tide in the Ladies' Room,' written and directed by Marcia Haufrecht". The Off-Off-Broadway Review.  Volume 7, Number 13. November 16, 2000. Retrieved 2013-01-02.
DeVita, Doug. "Review: Common Basis Theatre presents 'Pinecrest Rest Haven'". The Off-Off-Broadway Review.  Volume 7, Number 24. March 29, 2001. Retrieved 2013-01-02.
Mackler, David. "Review: Common Basis Theatre presents 'Lulu's Back in Town' and 'Surprise'". The Off-Off-Broadway Review.  Volume 7, Number 32. July 2, 2001. Retrieved 2013-01-02.

External links
 Official Website
 . Aired September 7, 2012.
Marcia Haufrecht at the Wisconsin Historical Society's Actors Studio audio collection, 1956-1969

1937 births
20th-century American actresses
21st-century American actresses
American acting coaches
Actresses from New York City
American directors
American film actresses
20th-century American dramatists and playwrights
American stage actresses
American television actresses
Columbia University faculty
Drama teachers
Living people
The New School faculty
New York University faculty
American women academics